Ctenotus colletti, also known commonly as the buff-tailed finesnout ctenotus, Collett’s ctenotus, and Collett's skink, is a species of lizard in the family Scincidae. The species is endemic to Australia.

Etymology
The specific name, colletti, is in honor of Norwegian zoologist Robert Collett.

Geographic range
Within Australia C. colletti is found in the Northern Territory and Western Australia,.

Habitat
The preferred natural habitat of C. colletti is shrubland.

Reproduction
C. colletti is oviparous.

References

Further reading
Boulenger GA (1896). "Descriptions of Four new Lizards from Roebuck Bay, N.W. Australia, obtained by Dr. Dahl for the Christiania Museum". Annals and Magazine of Natural History, Sixth Series 18: 232–235. (Lygosoma colletti, new species, pp. 234–235).
Cogger HG (2014). Reptiles and Amphibians of Australia, Seventh Edition. Clayton, Victoria, Australia: CSIRO Publishing. xxx + 1,033 pp. .
Wilson S, Swan G (2013). A Complete Guide to Reptiles of Australia, Fourth Edition. Sydney: New Holland Publishers. 522 pp. .

colletti
Reptiles described in 1896
Taxa named by George Albert Boulenger